The Handler is the third solo studio album by Har Mar Superstar. It was released via Record Collection in 2004. It features contributions from Karen O, Michael Bland, Pete Thomas, and Holly Valance. It peaked at number 68 on the UK Albums Chart.

Critical reception

At Metacritic, which assigns a weighted average score out of 100 to reviews from mainstream critics, the album received an average score of 57% based on 13 reviews, indicating "mixed or average reviews".

Jolie Lash of NME gave the album 4 stars out of 5, calling it "Har Mar Superstar's best effort to date." Johnny Loftus of Pitchfork gave the album a 1.9 out of 10, saying, "The Handler only meagerly amplifies what he was already doing, probably pleasing his no doubt respectable cadre of core followers, but handily turning off the rest of humanity."

Track listing

Charts

References

External links
 

2004 albums
Har Mar Superstar albums
Record Collection albums
Albums produced by John Fields (record producer)